New Frontier Bank was a financial company engaged primarily in retail banking, mortgage banking, business finance and providing ATM and merchant processing services. The bank was established in December 1998. The Bank had full service banking offices serving Greeley, and Windsor, Colorado.

On April 10, 2009, regulators shut down New Frontier Bank — the second Colorado bank to collapse in 2009, and the 23rd U.S. bank to fail in 2009.

See also
 List of largest U.S. bank failures

References

External links
FDIC Bank Closing Information for New Frontier Bank

Companies based in Greeley, Colorado
Bank failures in the United States
Banks established in 1998
Banks disestablished in 2009
Defunct companies based in Colorado
1998 establishments in Colorado
Defunct banks of the United States
2009 disestablishments in Colorado